Willkamayu (Quechua, hispanicized spelling Huyllcamayo) is a river in Peru located in the  Ayacucho Region, Victor Fajardo Province, Huancapi District. It is an affluent of the Pampas River.

Willkamayu originates near the village Llusita at the confluence of the rivers Urqu Mayu (Orcco Mayo) and Kachimayu (Cachimayo) of the Huancaraylla District. Its direction is mainly to the north. It flows almost parallel to Kinwamayu east of the Willkamayu. Near the village of Willka (Huilcca) Willkamayu meets the Pampas River.

References

Rivers of Peru
Rivers of Ayacucho Region